Amsil is a village in Kaepung, North Hwanghae, North Korea near the South Korean border. It is visible from the Odusan Unification Observatory in the southern border.

References

Villages in North Korea
North Hwanghae